Earl of Selkirk is a title in the Peerage of Scotland, used since 1646. It has rules of inheritance subject to unusual and unique provisions.

History
The title was created on 14 August 1646 for Lord William Douglas, third son of William Douglas, 1st Marquess of Douglas, along with the title Lord Daer and Shortcleuch. On 29 April 1656, the first Earl married Anne Hamilton, 3rd Duchess of Hamilton. In 1660, after the birth of two sons, he changed his surname from Douglas to "Hamilton", and was created Duke of Hamilton for life, as was then a not uncommon practice in Scotland when a peeress in her own right married someone of lesser degree.

On 6 October 1688, during the reign of James VII, the new Duke of Hamilton surrendered his previous titles to the Crown (except Hamilton). They were reconferred on his third (but second surviving) son Charles Douglas, 2nd Earl of Selkirk, who thereby became 2nd Earl of Selkirk, and who also reverted to his original surname of "Douglas". Thus, while the eldest son was to inherit the title of Duke of Hamilton and have his mother's maiden name for surname, the younger son was to inherit his father's dignities and perpetuate the name of Douglas.

This novodamus for this arrangement embodied a unique remainder, the effect of which was that:
 the titles would pass to the heirs male of the 1st earl's younger sons before the heirs male of his eldest son (who was heir apparent to his mother's Dukedom of Hamilton);
 if the person who would otherwise inherit the title was already duke of Hamilton (or would inherit that dukedom at the same time), the titles would pass instead to that duke's next surviving brother;
 if the titles were ever held by a duke of Hamilton (either because an earl of Selkirk succeeded as duke of Hamilton, or because provision 2 was unable to operate because the heir was a duke of Hamilton who had no surviving younger brothers), the titles would pass on that duke's death to his second surviving son;
 if the titles had passed to a younger brother or younger son under provisions 2 or 3, they would then pass to his heirs male on his death; but
 if such a younger son or younger brother's heirs male died out, the title would not pass to his own younger brothers and their heirs male, but would instead revert to the senior male line, with provisions 2 and 3 operating as before.

This remainder is so unusual that a Scottish country dance—Hamilton House—was created around it.

The 2nd earl died childless in 1739, and his younger brother, John Hamilton, 1st Earl of Ruglen (who had been so created on 14 April 1697), succeeded as 3rd earl. He outlived his son and heir, and when he died in 1744 the Earldom of Ruglen and its subsidiary titles passed to his daughter Anne Douglas, Countess of March, and on her death in 1748 to William Douglas, 3rd Earl of March (later 4th Duke of Queensberry).

The Earldom of Selkirk and its subsidiary title, being limited to male heirs, passed to Dunbar Hamilton, grandson of Lord Basil Hamilton, sixth son of the 1st earl. Upon succeeding as 4th earl, he, like the 2nd earl, changed his surname to "Douglas". On his death in 1799, he was succeeded by his only surviving son, Thomas Douglas, Lord Daer, as 5th earl, and he was then succeeded on his death in 1820 by his only son, Dunbar Douglas, Lord Daer, as 6th earl.

On his death in 1885, the heirs male of the younger sons of the 1st earl expired. The heir male of the 1st earl's eldest son was William Douglas-Hamilton, 12th Duke of Hamilton, but under the special remainder (provision 2 above) the titles passed instead to his younger brother, Lord Charles Hamilton, who succeeded as 7th earl. When he died unmarried in 1886, the titles reverted to his elder brother, who had no further brothers to whom they could pass, and who accordingly succeeded as 8th earl. When he died without a son in 1895, the dukedom passed to his fourth cousin, Alfred Douglas-Hamilton, who succeeded as 13th duke of Hamilton. As he also had no brothers, he also succeeded as 9th earl of Selkirk.

When he died in 1940, his eldest son, Douglas Douglas-Hamilton, Marquess of Douglas and Clydesdale, inherited the dukedom, but the Earldom of Selkirk and its subsidiary title passed under the special remainder (provision 3 above) to his second son, Lord George Douglas-Hamilton, who succeeded as 10th earl.

Upon the death of the 10th earl in 1994, married but childless, the titles passed (under provision 5 above) to his nephew, Lord James Douglas-Hamilton, second son of the 14th Duke of Hamilton and next brother of Angus Douglas-Hamilton, 15th Duke of Hamilton, who succeeded as 11th earl. This succession was unsuccessfully challenged in the Court of the Lord Lyon by Alasdair Douglas-Hamilton, son of Lord Malcolm Douglas-Hamilton, next brother of the 10th Earl. Lord Malcolm had died in 1969 as heir presumptive to the 10th earl and his son was listed thereafter in that position by reference works such as Whitaker's Almanack (page 155 of 1992 edition) and Debrett's Peerage (page P1141 of the 1995 edition, which went to press before the 10th earl's death) but it was the ruling of the court that the death of the 14th duke in 1973 had placed the younger sons of the 14th duke ahead of the younger sons of the 13th duke and their issue in line to the earldom.

The 11th earl was, at the time of his succession, the Member of Parliament for Edinburgh West, and he disclaimed the titles in order to remain in the House of Commons. He was later elevated to the House of Lords with a life peerage as Baron Selkirk of Douglas, and served as a Member of the Scottish Parliament. His heir (under provision 4 above) is John Douglas-Hamilton, Lord Daer, Master of Selkirk.

Earls of Selkirk (1646)
 William Douglas-Hamilton, 1st Earl of Selkirk, jure uxoris 3rd Duke of Hamilton (1634–1694)
 Charles Douglas, 2nd Earl of Selkirk (1663–1739) (younger brother of 4th Duke)
 John Hamilton, 3rd Earl of Selkirk (1664–1744) (younger brother of 2nd Earl)
 Dunbar Douglas, 4th Earl of Selkirk (1722–1799) (grandson of younger brother of 3rd Earl)
 Thomas Douglas, 5th Earl of Selkirk (1771–1820) (son of 4th Earl)
 Dunbar James Douglas, 6th Earl of Selkirk (1809–1885) (son of 5th Earl)
 Charles George Hamilton, 7th Earl of Selkirk (1847–1886) (younger brother of 12th Duke of Hamilton)
 William Alexander Louis Stephen Douglas-Hamilton, 12th Duke of Hamilton, 8th Earl of Selkirk (1845–1895) (older brother of 7th Earl)
 Alfred Douglas Douglas-Hamilton, 13th Duke of Hamilton, 9th Earl of Selkirk (1862–1940) (4th cousin of 12th Duke)
 George Nigel Douglas-Hamilton, 10th Earl of Selkirk (1906–1994) (younger brother of the 14th Duke of Hamilton)
 James Alexander Douglas-Hamilton, 11th Earl of Selkirk (b. 1942) (younger brother of the 15th Duke of Hamilton) (disclaimed 1994)

The heir apparent is the present holder's son John Andrew Douglas-Hamilton, Lord Daer (b. 1978).
Everyone listed in the line of succession in the Duke of Hamilton article is eligible to succeed to the Earldom, but in the order dictated by its special remainder:
the sons of Lord Selkirk of Douglas, starting with Lord Daer, come first (with potential male issue of any of them preceding younger brothers of that son), but should Lord Selkirk of Douglas survive all his male issue, or any future Earl of Selkirk die without a direct heir, the death of the 15th Duke of Hamilton in 2010 means that the younger son of the 15th Duke would rank ahead of lines from younger sons of the 14th Duke and the death of the 16th Duke would likewise move his younger sons to the head of the line.

External links
 
 
 
 
 National Library of Scotland - Papers relating to the 10th and 11th Earls of Selkirk and the Selkirk peerage, 1945-2004

References

Earldoms in the Peerage of Scotland
Selkirk
 
1646 establishments in Scotland
Noble titles created in 1646
 
Peerages created with special remainders